The 2015 Stadium Super Trucks Series, officially the Speed Energy Formula Off-Road presented by Traxxas championship, was the third season of the Stadium Super Trucks. Sheldon Creed won the championship.

2015 was the first season in which the trucks began racing in Australia.

Drivers

Schedule

Season summary

The season-opening tripleheader was held in conjunction with the V8 Supercars Championship's Clipsal 500, one of seven support events for the race. It was the trucks' first time racing in Australia. Of the ten drivers, six were series veterans: Robby Gordon, E. J. Viso, Keegan Kincaid, Charles Dorrance, Bill Hynes, and Sheldon Creed; also comprising the field were Australian racers: off-road motorcycle racer Toby Price, off-road racer Brad Gallard, former V8 Supercars driver Nathan Pretty, and stunt rider Matt Mingay. Before the start of the first race, Dorrance flipped in turn 9, and the effort to flip the truck back shortened the race from eight to five laps. Viso, starting from sixth, moved up the field and took the lead and eventual win after Pretty's suspension failed. Gordon finished second, followed by Mingay. Creed won the second round. In race three, backfield starters Creed, Gordon and Viso moved to the front quickly, and battled with Mingay for the lead, but Mingay and Viso made contact and spun in turn 6. Creed and Gordon duelled for second while Kincaid led for the remainder of the race. On the final lap, Gordon passed Creed in the final turn as Creed lost control of his truck; after jumping the second ramp, Creed flipped, hit the wall upon crossing the finish, and landed back on all four tires.

Formula Off-Road returned to the United States for the Grand Prix of St. Petersburg alongside the IndyCar Series. Due to rain, truck qualifying speeds were slower than in previous years, though Creed was still the fastest qualifier. Creed battled with IndyCar veteran Viso throughout the first race, but the latter fell out of podium position when he went wide in turn ten on the final lap. In the second race, Scotty Steele led until he began suffering from mechanical failure, allowing Burt Jenner to take his first career victory. Viso would rebound from his St. Petersburg error by winning at the Grand Prix of Long Beach, beating Creed by over five seconds.

At the Detroit Belle Isle Grand Prix, Gordon, Viso, and Jenner took round wins. Gordon won the first race after passing Viso on the final lap; Viso won the second when he held off Steele in a rainstorm; and Jenner won the third.

In early June, the series returned to the X Games at Circuit of the Americas for 2015. For the event, various drivers made their series debuts, three of whom were NASCAR drivers: 1989 NASCAR Winston Cup Series champion Rusty Wallace, road course ringer Boris Said, and former Nationwide Series driver and eleven-time X Games medalist Travis Pastrana. Additionally, Moto X biker Jeremy Stenberg competed in the event. Of the 16 drivers invited, five are teenagers, with four being younger than 17: C. J. Greaves (19), Creed (17), Jerett Brooks and Steele (16), and Gavin Harlien (15). Creed, Viso, Jenner, and Gordon won the four heat races to advance to the final, while Greaves was first in the Last Chance Qualifier. Harlien, Wallace, X Games Austin 2014 gold medalist Apdaly Lopez, Said, and Stenberg failed to qualify; Wallace also rolled his truck during the event. In the final, Creed utilized the holeshot to pull ahead and win gold.

At Honda Indy Toronto, Indy Lights and FIA Formula E Championship driver Matthew Brabham made his series debut shortly before the Friday practice; Paul Tracy was originally scheduled to drive the truck but television obligations forced him out. The weather for Saturday was dry, though Sunday was marred by wet conditions. Steele won his first Formula Off-Road race after passing Kincaid on the opening lap and leading the rest of the Saturday event, while Kincaid won the Sunday round in a 1–2 finish for Traxxas drivers when Creed finished behind him.

Between points rounds, the trucks participated in the Goodwood Festival of Speed.

In September, SST joined the Sand Sports Super Show, running on a mixed-surface course at the OC Fair & Event Center. Aaron Kaufman of Gas Monkey Garage made his series debut at the weekend; in one race, his truck landed and rode along a K-rail; afterward, Gordon joked it was "some of the best, worst driving I have ever seen from the Toyo Tires driver." P. J. Jones won the first night of racing, while Creed was victorious in the next two.

Formula Off-Road returned to Australia with Gold Coast 600 weekend at Surfers Paradise Street Circuit. 2014 Bathurst 1000 winner Paul Morris made his series debut in the weekend and was the fastest during qualifying. In the first race, Brett Thomas led early before suffering a penalty, with Mingay also receiving one after hitting a water barrier. Jenner held off Brabham to win the round. Creed, who suffered a broken axle in the race, bounced back in the second race when he barely beat Gordon to the finish for the victory. A doubleheader took place on October 25, with Creed winning the first and Mingay the second for his maiden SST victory. Morris scored the overall weekend win after finishing fifth and second that day.

The series remained in Australia for Round 20; despite initial plans to race at the Sydney Showground Stadium, the Trucks moved the race to the Valvoline Raceway in Granville as a support race for the Ultimate Sprintcar Championship due to clashing schedules. Creed went on to win.

Las Vegas Village hosted the 2015 season finale. NASCAR Whelen Euro Series driver Anthony Gandon made his series debut, while Greg Adler ran his first start since X Games Austin 2014. Gordon won the first race, while Creed won the second en route to his first SST championship.

In December, the trucks returned to Australia for an exhibition series at the Sydney 500. Creed won two of the races, while Mingay won the third.

Results and standings

Race results

Drivers' championship

Driver replacements

Notes

References

Speed Energy Formula Off-Road
Speed Energy Formula Off-Road
Speed Energy Formula Off-Road